The Church of Jesus Christ of Latter-day Saints in Jamaica refers to the Church of Jesus Christ of Latter-day Saints (LDS Church) and its members in Jamaica.  In 1980, there were 85 members in Jamaica. In 2021, there were 6,718 members in 18 congregations.

History

The first native converts to the LDS Church in Jamaica was the Victor and Verna Nugent family. They were baptized on January, 20 1974.  They were introduced to the church by Paul Schmiel but by 1976, the small Branch's American priesthood holders had to leave due to political unrest and economic hardships, leaving the Nugent's as the only members on the island.  They held church service in their home during this time. Missionaries returned in November 1978. On Dec. 5, 1978, Elder M. Russell Ballard dedicated the country for missionary work. 

Victor Nugent, a Mandeville resident, became the country's first native Elder and first Jamaican Branch and District President. Joseph Hamilton was the first Jamaican President of the Kingston Branch in 1982.  The Kingston District was organized on February 4, 1983.

Elder M. Russell Ballard visited Jamaica on December 5, 1978 and in April 1983, Thomas S. Monson visited the island. On May 15, 2002, President Gordon B. Hinckley addressed 2,000 people at a fireside in Kingston.

On June 8, 2014, Elder Jeffery R. Holland presided over a conference with 800 attendees to organize the Kingston Jamaica Stake. The Kingston Jamaica Stake was the second English-speaking stake to be organized in the Caribbean after the creation of the Spain Trinidad Stake in 2009.

On March 30, 2019, The Jamaican Red Cross awarded LDS Church in Jamaica a Humanitarian Services Award for aid provided through the LDS Charities at the JRC School of Transformation in Central Village, Spanish Town, and Clarendon.

Stake and District
As of February 2023, the following stake and district was located in Jamaica:

Kingston Jamaica Stake
Boulevard Ward
Constant Spring Ward
Kingston Branch (Kingston Branch)
Linstead Ward
Old Harbour Branch
Portmore Ward
Spanish Town 1st Ward
Spanish Town 2nd Ward

Mandeville Jamaica District
Hopeton Branch (Hopeton Branch)
Junction Branch (Junction Branch)
Mandeville Branch
May Pen Branch
Montego Bay Branch  (Montego Bay Branch)
Santa Cruz Branch
Savanna-La-Mar Branch

Other Congregations
The following congregations are not part of a stake or district:
Ocho Rios Branch
Port Antonio Branch
Yallahs Branch
Congregations not within a stake are named branches, regardless of size.

Mission
Jamaica was administered by Florida Fort Lauderdale Mission 1974 until 1983 when the West Indies Mission was created. In 1985, the Jamaica Kingston Mission was organized. This mission covers Jamaica, the Bahamas, Turks and Caicos, and the Cayman Islands.

Temples
Jamaica is located in the Panama City Panama Temple District.

References

External links
 The Church of Jesus Christ of Latter-day Saints - Caribbean Area - Official Site
 Newsroom: Jamaica - News and Information
 ComeUntoChrist.org - Visitors Site

Christian denominations in Jamaica
The Church of Jesus Christ of Latter-day Saints in North America